The Marketer was a marketing magazine published ten times a year by Redactive Publishing Ltd. Both The Marketer and www.themarketer.co.uk were the official magazine and website of The Chartered Institute of Marketing. The Marketer aimed to offer in-depth analyses and practical guides to help marketers stay at the cutting edge of the profession, combining the Institute's academic expertise with marketers’ real-life experience to promote marketing as a core business function. It was distributed in several countries around the world including Britain, Australia, Ghana, China, Kenya, Malaysia, New Zealand, Poland, Singapore and Sri Lanka.

Its circulation from 1 July 2007 to 30 June 2008 was 36,755. Its monthly e-newsletter was sent out to 80,000 recipients.

In 2015 the magazine ceased publication and was replaced by another magazine, Catalyst.

References

Business magazines published in the United Kingdom
Defunct magazines published in the United Kingdom
Magazines established in 2007
Magazines disestablished in 2015
Ten times annually magazines